Psalm 118 is the 118th psalm of the Book of Psalms, beginning in the English of the King James Version: "O give thanks unto the LORD; for he is good: because his mercy endureth for ever." The Book of Psalms is part of the third section of the Hebrew Bible, and a book of the Christian Old Testament. In the slightly different numbering system used in the Greek Septuagint and Latin Vulgate translations of the Bible, this psalm is Psalm 117. In Latin, it is known as "Confitemini Domino quoniam bonus quoniam in saeculum misericordia eius". Its themes are thanksgiving to God and reliance on God rather than on human strength.

The psalm forms a regular part of Jewish, Catholic, Eastern Orthodox, Lutheran, Anglican and other Protestant liturgies.

Text

Hebrew Bible version 

Following is the Hebrew text of Psalm 118:

King James Version 

 O give thanks unto the LORD; for he is good: because his mercy endureth for ever.
 Let Israel now say, that his mercy endureth for ever.
 Let the house of Aaron now say, that his mercy endureth for ever.
 Let them now that fear the LORD say, that his mercy endureth for ever.
 I called upon the LORD in distress: the LORD answered me, and set me in a large place.
 The LORD is on my side; I will not fear: what can man do unto me?
 The LORD taketh my part with them that help me: therefore shall I see my desire upon them that hate me.
 It is better to trust in the LORD than to put confidence in man.
 It is better to trust in the LORD than to put confidence in princes.
 All nations compassed me about: but in the name of the LORD will I destroy them.
 They compassed me about; yea, they compassed me about: but in the name of the LORD I will destroy them.
 They compassed me about like bees: they are quenched as the fire of thorns: for in the name of the LORD I will destroy them.
 Thou hast thrust sore at me that I might fall: but the LORD helped me.
 The LORD is my strength and song, and is become my salvation.
 The voice of rejoicing and salvation is in the tabernacles of the righteous: the right hand of the LORD doeth valiantly.
 The right hand of the LORD is exalted: the right hand of the LORD doeth valiantly.
 I shall not die, but live, and declare the works of the LORD.
 The LORD hath chastened me sore: but he hath not given me over unto death.
 Open to me the gates of righteousness: I will go into them, and I will praise the LORD:
 This gate of the LORD, into which the righteous shall enter.
 I will praise thee: for thou hast heard me, and art become my salvation.
 The stone which the builders refused is become the head stone of the corner.
 This is the LORD's doing; it is marvellous in our eyes.
 This is the day which the LORD hath made; we will rejoice and be glad in it.
 Save now, I beseech thee, O LORD: O LORD, I beseech thee, send now prosperity.
 Blessed be he that cometh in the name of the LORD: we have blessed you out of the house of the LORD.
 God is the LORD, which hath shewed us light: bind the sacrifice with cords, even unto the horns of the altar.
 Thou art my God, and I will praise thee: thou art my God, I will exalt thee.
 O give thanks unto the LORD; for he is good: for his mercy endureth for ever.

Theme and structure 
This psalm is centered on God, in a movement that expresses gratitude, admiration, joy and praise. In the King James Version, the Lord is mentioned in almost every verse.

Notable verses

Verse 5
 I called on the Lord in distress;
 The Lord answered me and set me in a large place.
Instead of "a large place" or "a broad place", many translations state the  "set me free".

Verse 14
The Lord is my strength and song,
And He has become my salvation.

Verse 22

 The stone which the builders rejected
 Has become the chief cornerstone.

Verse 23

 This was the Lord’s doing;
 It is marvelous in our eyes.

Uses

Judaism
 
Psalm 118 is the last of the so-called Egyptian Hallel. It is read on the days of recitation of the hallel. 
It is one of six psalms (113-118) of which Hallel is composed. On all days when Hallel is recited, this psalm is recited in its entirety, with the final ten verses being recited twice.
Verse 1 is recited by some following Psalm 126 preceding Birkat Hamazon.
Verse 5 is recited prior to the Shofar blowing on Rosh Hashanah.
Verses 5-9 are part of Tashlikh.
Verse 24 may be a source of the Israeli song Hava Nagila.
Verse 25 is part of the long Tachanun recited on Mondays and Thursdays.
Verse 27 is the source to the name isru chag.

New Testament

Parts of this Psalm were quoted by Jesus and writers of the New Testament. 
 Verse 6 is quoted in Hebrews 
Jesus said to them (the chief priests and the elders of the people), "Have you never read in the Scriptures: "'The stone that the builders rejected has become the cornerstone; this was the Lord's doing, and it is marvelous in our eyes'?" Opposition and difficulties are seen in this Psalm but in the midst of it God will display His salvation.
"Blessed is he who comes in the name of the Lord!"

Catholic Church
This psalm was chosen by St Benedict towards 530, as the third psalm during the solemn office of the Sunday laudes (Rule of Saint Benedict, chapter XI10).

Psalm 118 (117) is now read in the liturgy of the Hours every Sunday of the first and third weeks, at the office of Sext.

Psalm 118 is also closely associated with Easter in the Catholic Church, and it is typically sung at the Easter Vigil and the morning Mass on Easter Sunday. The gradual for Easter is based on verse 24, . As a result, many compositions are based on this textual fragment.

Anglicanism
An extract from verse 23 is inscribed on several English coins, with the text of the Vulgate: a Domino factum est istud hoc est mirabile in oculis nostris. Upon her accession to the throne, Elizabeth I of England is said to have pronounced this same verse, also in Latin, as quoted in the New Testament: A Domino factum est illud et est mirabile in oculis nostris.

Music 
The hymn in German "Nun saget Dank und lobt den Herren" is a paraphrase of Psalm 118. It has been set to music by various composers. 

The beginning of the psalm was set by Goran Trajkoski for a production, Eternal House, at the Macedonian National Theatre.

References

External links 

 
 
 Psalms Chapter 118 text in Hebrew and English, mechon-mamre.org
 Text of Psalm 118 according to the 1928 Psalter
 Give thanks to the LORD, for he is good, his mercy endures forever. text and footnotes, usccb.org United States Conference of Catholic Bishops
 Psalm 118:1 introduction and text, biblestudytools.com
 Psalm 118 – The Chief Cornerstone enduringword.com
 Psalm 118 / Refrain: I will give thanks to you, for you have become my salvation. Church of England
 Psalm 118 at biblegateway.com
 Recording of the last two verses of the psalm as sung during Hallel
 Charles H. Spurgeon: Psalm 118 detailed commentary, archive.spurgeon.org
 

118
Hallel
Bible